Tribbles homolog 2 is an atypical protein kinase that is encoded in human by the TRIB2 gene. TRIB2 is a pseudokinase member of the (pseudoenzyme) class of signaling/scaffold proteins, possessing little vestigial catalytic output in vitro. It is known to signal to canonical MAPK pathways and to regulate the ubiquitination of substrates with important functions in the immune system. It has also been associated with various diseases, especially in vertebrate leukaemia models. Like TRIB1 and TRIB3, TRIB2 has recently been considered as a potential allosteric drug target, and is a putative regulator of cancer-associated signalling and survival through AKT pSer473 modulation

References

Further reading

EC 2.7.11